Hitchcock County is a county in the U.S. state of Nebraska. As of the 2020 United States Census, the population was 2,616. Its county seat is Trenton.

In the Nebraska license plate system, Hitchcock County is represented by the prefix 67 (it had the sixty-seventh-largest number of vehicles registered in the county when the license plate system was established in 1922).

History
Hitchcock County was formed in 1873. It was named for US Senator Phineas Warren Hitchcock.

The Massacre Canyon battle between Sioux and Pawnee took place on August 5, 1873, at a spot three miles east of Trenton.

Geography
The terrain of Hitchcock County consists of rolling low hills. The flattened hilltops are used for agriculture; mostly dry farming with some center pivot irrigation. The Republican River flows eastward through the central part of the county.

The eastern two-thirds of the state of Nebraska observes Central Time; the western portion of the state observes Mountain Time. Hitchcock County is the westernmost county to observe Central Time.

Lakes
Swanson Lake: formed by a dam on the Republican River, between Stratton and Trenton.

Major highways

  U.S. Highway 6
  U.S. Highway 34
  Nebraska Highway 17
  Nebraska Highway 25
  Nebraska Highway 25A

Adjacent counties

 Red Willow County – east
 Rawlins County, Kansas – south
 Dundy County – west (Mountain Time border)
 Hayes County – north
 Frontier County –northeast

Demographics

As of the 2000 United States Census, there were 3,111 people, 1,287 households, and 899 families in the county. The population density was 4 people per square mile (2/km2). There were 1,675 housing units at an average density of 2 per square mile (1/km2). The racial makeup of the county was 98.36% White, 0.10% Black or African American, 0.29% Native American, 0.13% Asian, 0.29% from other races, and 0.84% from two or more races. 1.41% of the population were Hispanic or Latino of any race.

There were 1,287 households, out of which 28.00% had children under the age of 18 living with them, 61.10% were married couples living together, 6.40% had a female householder with no husband present, and 30.10% were non-families. 27.40% of all households were made up of individuals, and 15.50% had someone living alone who was 65 years of age or older. The average household size was 2.37 and the average family size was 2.89.

The county population contained 23.80% under the age of 18, 5.90% from 18 to 24, 22.60% from 25 to 44, 25.40% from 45 to 64, and 22.30% who were 65 years of age or older. The median age was 44 years. For every 100 females there were 95.00 males. For every 100 females age 18 and over, there were 92.60 males.

The median income for a household in the county was $28,287, and the median income for a family was $34,490. Males had a median income of $25,833 versus $18,879 for females. The per capita income for the county was $14,804. About 10.90% of families and 14.90% of the population were below the poverty line, including 22.90% of those under age 18 and 8.40% of those age 65 or over.

Communities

Villages 
 Culbertson
 Palisade (partial)
 Stratton
 Trenton (county seat)

Former communities

 Beverly
 Blackwood
 Cornell
 Dike
 Driftwood
 Meeker
 Poe
 Rill
 Rupert

Politics
Hitchcock County is strongly Republican in presidential elections. Since 1900, the county has failed to back the Republican candidate in only five presidential elections, most recently in 1936 in the midst of Franklin D. Roosevelt's national landslide victory. Republicans also hold a voter registration advantage of 1,326 registered Republicans compared with just 262 registered Democrats in Hitchcock County as of 2021.

See also
 National Register of Historic Places listings in Hitchcock County, Nebraska

References

External links

 
Nebraska counties
1873 establishments in Nebraska
Populated places established in 1873